William 'Bill' Owen Thomas (27 April 1921 – 8 August 2000) was an English first-class cricketer and schoolmaster.

Thomas was born at Middlesbrough in April 1921. He was educated at Dulwich College, before serving in the Second World War, being commissioned into the Green Howards as a second lieutenant in March 1941. Following the war, he went up to the University of Cambridge. While studying at Cambridge, he made his debut in first-class cricket for Cambridge University against the Free Foresters at Fenner's in 1948. He made two further first-class appearances for Cambridge, both in 1948, against Hampshire and Sussex. He took 3 wickets for Cambridge with his slow left-arm orthodox bowling. After graduating from Cambridge he became a schoolteacher. While teaching at Gresham's School, he played minor counties cricket for Norfolk from 1952–59, making 62 appearances in the Minor Counties Championship. He made a final first-class appearance for the Marylebone Cricket Club against Cambridge University at Lord's in 1954. He died in August 2000 at Sheringham, Norfolk. His son-in-law, Quorn Handley, played List A one-day cricket.

References

External links

1921 births
2000 deaths
People from Middlesbrough
People educated at Dulwich College
British Army personnel of World War II
Green Howards officers
Alumni of the University of Cambridge
English cricketers
Cambridge University cricketers
Norfolk cricketers
Marylebone Cricket Club cricketers
Schoolteachers from Norfolk
English cricketers of 1946 to 1968